Aviateca S.A. branded Avianca Guatemala is a regional airline headquartered in Guatemala City. Aviateca was under government ownership and remained so until 1989 when it joined the Grupo TACA alliance of Central America and was privatized. It was fully integrated into TACA, operating under the TACA Regional banner, which later merged with Avianca.

History

The airline was established in 1929 as Aerovías de Guatemala and was founded by Alfredo Denby Chattfield. In March 14, 1945, the airline was nationalized during the government of Juan José Arevalo and established as Empresa Guatemalteca de Aviación S.A. which was shortened to Aviateca. One of the original founders was Alfredo Castaneda Duarte who also served as a pilot. Aviateca started operations in March 1946 and early aircraft operated by the carrier including the Douglas DC-3.

In 1961, service to Miami was originated with four-engined Douglas DC-6 airliners. The airline later operated the Douglas DC-6B version as well. Convair CV-240 family airliners were also acquired to replace some of the DC-3s on short-haul routes in Latin America.

Aviateca introduced jet service as a customer for the BAC One-Eleven medium twin jet in 1970. In 1974, the airline was operating the stretched BAC One-Eleven series 500 version of the British-manufactured jet on international flights to Miami, New Orleans, Mexico City, Mérida and San Jose, Costa Rica. The airline's fleet was referred to by locals as "Las Papayas Voladoras" (The Flying Papayas) due to the paint scheme used during the 1970s, in which the underbelly was painted a reddish orange. It also temporarily leased a Fokker F28 Fellowship, some Boeing 720s and a Douglas DC-8-61. Aviateca later acquired two Boeing 727-100s, which operated for the airline in the 1980s. From 1989 on, Aviateca's fleet consisted of several Boeing 737-200 and Boeing 737-300 jetliners, including a full cargo 737-300 that operated for a few months.

Between 2006 and 2007, Aviateca operated a few Airbus A319s with the TACA-style Aviateca logo on the engines. Five of TACA's ATR 42-300s were registered for Aviateca in Guatemala. Due to reorganization measures at Avianca Holdings, Aviateca was renamed Avianca Guatemala in 2013.

In March 2021, the airline terminated all destinations and transferred its operations to Avianca. However, in October 2022, Avianca Group announced that it would reactivate Avianca Guatemala's operations by December 2022.

Destinations

This is a list of destinations of served by both Aviateca and Avianca Guatemala throughout their existence.

Fleet

Current fleet

As of February 2023, the Avianca Guatemala fleet will consist of the following aircraft:

Former fleet
Throughout its operations, the airline operated these aircraft:

Accidents and incidents
On February 17, 1975, Douglas C-47A (registered TG-AMA) was destroyed by fire at El Petén Airport, Tikal.
On November 18, 1975, Douglas C-47 TG-AGA crashed within Petén Department whilst on a passenger flight from Uaxactun Airport to Flores International Airport, Santa Elena.
On April 27, 1977, Convair CV-240 (registered TG-ACA) crashed near Guatemala City, Guatemala, killing all 28 people on board.
On September 30, 1977, Douglas C-47A (registered TG-AKA) was damaged beyond economic repair in a landing accident at Flores International Airport, Santa Elena. One of the three crew members was killed.
On July 26, 1978, Douglas DC-3 (registered TG-AFA) overran the runway at Flores International Airport following a birdstrike on take-off and was reported to have been damaged beyond economic repair. The aircraft was later repaired and returned to service.
The aircraft was on an IFR flight plan from La Aurora International Airport to Comalapa International Airport. All 7 crew members and 58 passengers died on the crash. Severe weather existed at the time, and the aircraft had deviated from airway G436 to the north to avoid thunderstorms.

See also
List of airlines of Guatemala

References

External links

Official website
Aviateca Former fleet Detail
Aviateca's Photos

 
Airlines established in 1929
Airlines of Guatemala
Avianca
1929 establishments in Guatemala
Grupo TACA